Fiumara is an Italian surname. Notable people with the surname include:

Gianfranco Pappalardo Fiumara (born 1978), Italian pianist
Tino Fiumara (1941–2010), American mobster

Italian-language surnames